The Kanalla Falls, a waterfall on the Edeowie Creek, is located in the Flinders Ranges in South Australia.

See also

 List of waterfalls of South Australia

References

Waterfalls of South Australia
Flinders Ranges
Far North (South Australia)